Shedd may refer to:

Institutions 

 The Shedd Aquarium, in Chicago, Illinois.
 The John G. Shedd Institute for the Arts, in Eugene, Oregon.

Places 

Shedd, Oregon

See also
 Shedd (surname)
 Shed
 Sheed